Sergio Díaz-Granados Guida (born 3 October 1968) was the 3rd Minister of Commerce, Industry and Tourism of Colombia. Before he was called to head the ministry, he served as Deputy Minister of Industrial Development. He has served as Member of the Chamber of Representatives of Colombia from 2002 to 2006, Deputy in the Magdalena Departmental Assembly from 1998 to 2000, and Councilman in the Santa Marta City Council from 1995 to 1997.

References

External links
 

1968 births
Living people
People from Santa Marta
Members of the Chamber of Representatives of Colombia
Ministers of Commerce, Industry and Tourism of Colombia
Social Party of National Unity politicians
University of Salamanca alumni